Nemotelus lasiops is a species of soldier fly in the family Stratiomyidae.

Distribution
Italy, Tunisia.

References

Stratiomyidae
Insects described in 1846
Diptera of Africa
Diptera of Europe
Taxa named by Hermann Loew